The Rhinos women's cricket team is a Zimbabwean women's cricket team based in Kwekwe. They compete in the Fifty50 Challenge and the Women's T20 Cup.

History
The team were formed in 2020, to compete in Zimbabwe's two new women's domestic competitions: the Fifty50 Challenge and the Women's T20 Cup. In the Fifty50 Challenge, the side finished second in the group with four wins from their six matches to qualify for the final.  In the final, they lost to Mountaineers by 62 runs via the Duckworth–Lewis–Stern method. Rhinos batter Josephine Nkomo was the leading-run scorer in the tournament. In the Women's T20 Cup, the side finished bottom of the group stage, winning two of their six matches.

In 2021–22, they again reached the final of the Fifty50 Challenge, finishing second in the group stage, but lost the final to Eagles by 167 runs. Rhinos batter Josephine Nkomo was the leading run-scorer in the competition for the second season running. They finished third in the Women's T20 Cup.

Players

Current squad
Based on appearances in the 2021–22 season. Players in bold have international caps.

Seasons

Fifty50 Challenge

Women's T20 Cup

Honours
 Fifty50 Challenge:
 Winners (0):
 Best finish: 2020–21 & 2021–22 (Runners-up)
 Women's T20 Cup:
 Winners (0): 
 Best finish: 2021–22 (3rd)

See also
 Mid West Rhinos

References

Women's cricket teams in Zimbabwe